Legio X Gemina ("The Twins' Tenth Legion"), was a legion of the Imperial Roman army. It was one of the four legions used by Julius Caesar in 58 BC, for his invasion of Gaul. There are still records of the X Gemina in Vienna in the beginning of the 5th century. The legion symbol was a bull. Early on in its history, the legion was called X Equestris (mounted), because Caesar once used the legionaries as cavalry.

In Republican Service

Gallic Wars
See also Legio X Equestris
In the Gallic Wars, X Equestris played an important role on Caesar's military success and for this reason is sometimes said to be his favorite. In Caesar's campaigns they were present in the battle of the Sabis, the invasions of Britain, and the battle of Gergovia. They remained faithful to Caesar in the civil war against Pompey, being present in the battles of Pharsalus (49 BC) and Munda (45 BC). In 45 BC Caesar disbanded the legion, giving the veterans farmlands near Narbonne in Gaul and in Hispania.

Augustus
The legion was reconstituted in 42 BC and fought for Augustus (then Octavian), Lepidus and Mark Antony in the Battle of Philippi against the murderers of Caesar. After this, they followed Mark Antony in his campaign against Parthia and were defeated with him at Actium. Augustus then took control of the legion and settled the veterans in Patras. The legion rebelled and lost its cognomen Equestris as punishment. Replacements were added from other legions, and the Tenth was rebaptized Gemina.

In Imperial Service
From about 30 BC the newly formed X Gemina was relocated to Petavonium in Hispania Tarraconensis, where Augustus was preparing a campaign against the Cantabrians. Their veterans were among the first inhabitants of modern Zaragoza and Emerita Augusta, modern Mérida.

The legion was sent to Carnuntum in Pannonia in about 63 AD (or a bit earlier) after legio XV Apollinaris left and went to the east. During the brief reign of Galba (68-69), it was transferred back to Hispania.

Under the Flavian dynasty

However, its stay in Hispania was to be very brief. In 70, after the Batavian rebellion was suppressed by the new emperor Vespasian, X Gemina was sent to Batavia in Germania Inferior to police the lands and prevent new revolts. From 71 to 103, the legion was stationed at the base built by II Adiutrix at Oppidum Batavorum, the present day Dutch city of Nijmegen.

As part of the army of Germania Inferior, X Gemina fought against the rebellion of the governor of Germania Superior, L. Antonius Saturninus, against Emperor Domitian. For this reason, the Tenth — as well as the other legions of the army, I Minervia, VI Victrix, and XXII Primigenia — received the title Pia Fidelis Domitiana, "faithful and loyal to Domitian", with the reference to the Emperor dropped at his death and subsequent damnatio memoriae.

2nd century
During Trajan's first campaign in Dacia (101–102), the legion participated at the Second Battle of Tapae, fighting against the army of the Dacians led by King Decebalus.

In 103, it was moved to Aquincum and later to Vindobona (modern Vienna), in Pannonia Superior, which would be the legion's camp until the 5th century.

Vexillationes of the X Gemina fought against the rebellion of Simon bar Kokhba in 132-135, in Iudaea, others participated in the Parthian campaign of Lucius Verus in 162. Another major campaign was the one fought against the Quadi, Marcomanni and the Lombards, in Moravia, (Dyje-Svratka Vale) under the command of Emperor Marcus Aurelius (168-180). A garrison of Legio X GPF was found in the Czech Republic in Roman fortress in Moravia (Mušov)

X Gemina supported its governor, Septimius Severus, in his bid for purple, and many men of the legion went to Rome to become part of the Praetorian Guard of the new Emperor.

3rd century
During the 3rd century, the legion fought for several emperors, who awarded the legion with titles showing the fidelity of the legion and the favour gained by the Emperor himself. The titles Antoniniana (awarded by Caracalla or Elagabalus), Gordiana (by Gordian III), Deciana (by Decius), Floriana (by Florianus), and Cariniana (by Carinus) were short-lived, however, and dropped after the death of the Emperor. For its support of Emperor Gallienus against Postumus, the Gemina was awarded the title Pia VI Fidelis VI, "six times faithful, six times loyal".

4th century
At the time in which Notitia Dignitatum was written (late 4th century), the first detachment of Decima Gemina was under the command of the Magister Militum per Orientem, and was a comitatensis unit. The other detachment was still in Vindobona, under the command of the Dux Pannoniae primae et Norici ripensis.

Attested members

Epigraphic evidence
 - Lucius Lavius  Tuscus Felicitis Iulia miles legionis X Geminae Victricis- Porto (Portus), Portugal.  AE 1953, 268.
 -  sacrum Caius Valerius Carus miles legionis X Geminae votum solvit libens merito. Lugo (Lucus Augusti), Spain. Hisp. Epi. 19118.
 - Caius Iulius Sergia Hispali (f) Victor miles legionis X Gemina (centuria Fabi Celtiberi annorum XLII aerum / XVIII hic (...). Pontevedra, Spain. CIL II 2545.
 - Iovi Augusto Ultori sacrum Lucius Valerius Paternus miles legionis X Geminae optio centuria Censoris exs (...). Pontevedra, Spain. AE 1908, 147.
 - Gaius Iulius Primus miles veteranus legionis X Geminae / hic situs estsit tibi terra levis. Jaen, Andalucía, Spain. CIL II2/5, 5.
 - Dis Manibus Gaio Urbanio Firmino militi legionis X / Iulius Ingenuus miles legionis. Jaen, Andalucía, Spain. CIL II 1691
 - Capito Sunnae filius decurio equitum alae geminae legionis X Rustica Galli filia. Sevilla (Hispalis), Spain.CIL II2/5, 1136.
 - Publius Talius Quinti filius Papiria (tribu) legionis X hic situs est sit tibi terra (...). Beja (Pax Iulia), Portugal. Hisp. Epi. 23031.
 - Marcus Aurelius Marci filius Galeria (tribu) Abbicus miles legionis X decimae. Beja (Pax Iulia), Portugal. AE 1980, 562.
 - Lucius Octavius Luci filius Pupinia (tribu) Baeterensis Magius  legionis X Geminae(...). Astorga (Asturica), Spain. AE 1928, 163.
 - Caius Pelgus Luci filius Scaptia (tribu) Clemens veteranus legionis) X Geminae vixit annos LVI hic situs est/ Caius Pelgus (...). Astorga (Asturica), Spain.  CIL II 5076 = CIL II 5662 = AE 1904, 160.
 - Caius Coelius Cai filius Papiria (tribu) Valens Narniense miles legionis X Geminae  (...). Astorga (Asturica), Spain. IRPLe 79.
 - Marcus Persius Marci filius Pollia (tribu) Blaesus domo Hasta miles legionis X Geminae centuria (...). Astorga (Asturica), Spain. AE 1904, 160.
 - Lucius Herennius Luci filius) Galeria (tribu) Callicus domo Ugia miles legionis X Geminae / centuria Licini Clementis annorum / (...). Zamora, Spain. CIL II 5076 = CIL II 5662 = AE 1904, 180.
 - Publius Cosconius Publi filius / Galeria Arsensis / miles legionis X Geminae  (...). Zamora, Spain. AE 1928, 179.
 - Marcus Cornelius Marci filius Aniensi Foro Iulii miles legionis X Geminae  (...). Zamora, Spain. Hisp. Epi. 15846.
 - Rufus miles legionis X Geminae fecit. Zamora, Spain. AE 1997, 867.
 - Marcus Volumnius Cai filius Aniensi / Cremona miles legionis X hic situs est. Zamora, Spain. CIL II 2631.
 - Dis Manibus Tito Cassio Flavino centurioni legionis X Geminae Chrysampelus patrono optimo pecunia sua fecit. Tarragona (Tarraco), Spain. CIL II 4152.
 - Severus Marci filius (...) miles legionis X Geminae centuriae (...). Burgos, Spain. Hisp. epi. 16472.

See also

 List of Roman legions
 Roman legion

Notes

References

 Lendering, Jona, "Legio X Gemina" from Livius, livius.org

External links
 Legio Decima Gemina - re-enactment group
 Legio X Gemina Pia Fidelis – re-enactment group
 Legio X - Legio X Gemina (Equites) – "Viri Clarissimi"

10 Gemina
50s BC establishments
58 BC
10 Gemina
10 Gemina
Military units and formations established in the 1st century BC